The Toys were an American pop girl group from Jamaica, New York, which was formed in 1961 and disbanded in 1968. Their most successful recording was "A Lover's Concerto" (1965), which sold more than two million copies and reached the number-two spot on the Billboard Hot 100 chart.

Members
The trio consisted of:
 Barbara Harris (born Barbara Ann Harris, August 18, 1945, Elizabeth City, North Carolina), who sang lead most of the time
 Barbara Parritt (born October 1, 1944, Wilmington, North Carolina)
 June Montiero (born July 1, 1946, Queens, New York)

Career

Barbara Harris started singing in her hometown churches at an early age and moved to Queens, New York, when she was 11 years old. In high school, she joined a group with four other young singers: Barbara Parritt (later Toomer), June Montiero, Betty Stokes and Betty Blocker.

Stokes and Blocker eventually left the group, and Harris, Parritt and Montiero formed a trio. Bobby Uri, a manager and friend, named the group The Charlettes,  and got them work doing background vocals for several recording artists. At a talent show in Brooklyn, they met Eddy Chase, who in turn introduced them to manager Vince Marc and songwriter/recording executive Bob Crewe. The group became the Toys and landed their first recording contract on Crewe's DynoVoice Records.

Marc introduced them to songwriters Sandy Linzer and Denny Randell. Linzer and Randell wrote most of the songs they recorded. They took a piano piece from a Bach exercise book ("Minuet in G major" by Christian Petzold), put a Motown bassline to it, and "A Lover's Concerto" was born; the song soon rose to number two on the U.S. Billboard Hot 100. The band followed that up with another hit, "Attack!", also written by Linzer and Randell, which reached the Top 20.

They also produced the group's 1965–66 recordings on the DynoVoice record label. Global sales of this disc exceeded two million copies, with a gold record awarded by the R.I.A.A. in 1965.
Their first U.S. tour was with Gene Pitney. In 1967, the group changed labels and producers, moving to Pitney's label, Musicor Records, but charted only one more minor single (a cover of Brian Hyland's "Sealed with a Kiss") before breaking up.

The Toys appeared on most of the major TV rock programs, including Hullabaloo and Shindig!. They had a cameo role performing their song "Attack!" in the 1967 beach movie It's a Bikini World.

Harris continued to perform on public television and at "Oldie Shows" as "The Toys featuring Barbara Harris". She has also sung with Joe Rivers, known for Johnnie & Joe's hit, "Over The Mountain". In 1998, she produced and released her first solo CD entitled Barbara Now, for which she wrote all but two of the songs. In 2016, she released the singles, "Forever Spring" and "(Rock 'n' Roll) Soothes The Soul".

Discography

Singles
(U.S. chart positions are Billboard Hot 100 except as noted.)
1965: "A Lover's Concerto" (U.S. No. 2 (Cashbox charts: No. 1), UK No. 5)
1966: "Attack!" (U.S. No. 18, UK No. 36)
1966: "Baby Toys" (U.S. No. 76)
1966: "Silver Spoon" (U.S. No. 111)
1966: "May My Heart Be Cast into Stone" (U.S. No. 85)
1968: "Sealed with a Kiss" (U.S. No. 112, U.S. R&B No. 43)

Albums
1966: The Toys Sing "A Lover's Concerto" and "Attack!" (U.S.  Billboard 200 No. 92; Billboard Black Albums No. 9) - a CD version was released in 1994 with two bonus tracks.

References

External links
Barbara Harris' official site
Interview with The Toys
The Toys at Doo Wop Heaven

 

African-American girl groups
American rhythm and blues musical groups
Musical groups established in 1961
Musical groups disestablished in 1968
African-American women singers
1961 establishments in New York City
Musical groups from Queens, New York